The Organization of Iranian People's Fedai Guerrillas (OIPFG), simply known as Fadaiyan-e-Khalq was an underground Marxist–Leninist guerrilla organization in Iran.

Ideology 
Ideologically, the group pursued an Anti-imperialist agenda and embraced armed propaganda to justify its revolutionary armed struggle against Iran's monarchy system, and believed in Materialism. They rejected reformism, and were inspired by thoughts of Mao Zedong, Che Guevara, and Régis Debray.

They criticized the National Front and the Liberation Movement as "Petite bourgeoisie paper organizations still preaching the false hope of peaceful change". Fedai Guerrillas initially criticized the Soviet Union and the Tudeh Party as well, however they later abandoned the stance as a result of cooperation with the socialist camp.

Bijan Jazani, known as the "intellectual father" of the organization, contributed to its ideology by writing a series of pamphlets such as "Struggle against the Shah's Dictatorship", "What a Revolutionary Must Know" and "How the Armed Struggle Will Be Transformed into a Mass Struggle?". The pamphlets were followed by Masoud Ahmadzadeh's treatise "Armed Struggle: Both a Strategy and a Tactic" and "The Necessity of Armed Struggle and the Rejection of the Theory of Survival" by Amir Parviz Pouyan.

Electoral history

Leadership 
The group was governed by collective leadership. Before the Iranian Revolution, its six-members leadership did not use the term 'central committee'.

See also
Guerrilla groups of Iran

References

Defunct communist militant groups
Defunct communist parties in Iran
Guerrilla organizations
Political parties of the Iranian Revolution
Militant opposition to the Pahlavi dynasty
Banned communist parties
Banned political parties in Iran
Militant opposition to the Islamic Republic of Iran
Far-left political parties
Marxist organizations
Left-wing militant groups in Iran
Paramilitary organisations based in Iran